Hochmuth is the surname of:
 Abraham Hochmuth (1816–1889), Hungarian rabbi
 Bruno Hochmuth (1911–1967), Major General in the United States Marine Corps
 Walter Hochmuth (1904–1979), German politician, resistance fighter and diplomat of East Germany

See also 

 Marie Hochmuth Nichols (1908–1978), influential rhetorical critic
 Kristina Richter (née Hochmuth, born 1946), Olympic handball player
 Phu Bai Combat Base (also known as Camp Hochmuth) is a former U.S. military base
 Katharina Jacob (1907–1989), wife of German communist politician Walter Hochmuth
 Ines Mandl (née Hochmuth, 1917–2016) was an Austrian-born American biochemist